Console Generale Liuzzi was an Italian Liuzzi-class ocean-going submarine of the Regia Marina, launched in 1939 and sunk in 1940 by Royal Navy destroyers. It was named after Alberto Liuzzi (1898–1937), console generale (brigadier general) of Blackshirts.

Design

Armament
The four submarines of the Liuzzi-class were armed with a single  deck gun, four  machine guns in twin mounts and eight  torpedo tubes, with four reloads for a total of twelve torpedoes carried.

History 
Liuzzi was built at the Tosi Shipyard in Taranto. She was laid down on 1 October 1938 and launched on 17 September 1939.

Loss 
Attacked by the British destroyers Dainty, Ilex, Decoy, Defender and the Australian destroyer  Voyager south of Crete, she was scuttled on 27 June 1940. Her commanding officer at the time of the attack was Capitano di Corvetta Lorenzo Bezzi. He received the Italian Navy Gold Medal in recognition of the choice to go down with his ship after ordering his crew to abandon the sinking submarine.

Legacy
Even if the submarine was destroyed without sinking any enemy ships, it is remembered because of the sacrifice of its commander Lorenzo Bezzi. The Italian Submarine Naval school in Taranto was named in his honour.

References

External links
 Liuzzi Class submarines at Photo Gallery of World War II
 Console Generale Liuzzi Marina Militare website

Liuzzi-class submarines
Ships built by Cantieri navali Tosi di Taranto
Ships built in Taranto
1939 ships
World War II submarines of Italy
Lost submarines of Italy
Maritime incidents in June 1940
World War II shipwrecks in the Mediterranean Sea
Maritime incidents in Libya
Submarines sunk by British warships
Submarines sunk by Australian warships